Abella was a 14th-century physician.

Abella may also refer to:
Abella (surname)
Abella, Iran, a village in East Azerbaijan Province, Iran
Abella Center, a community, city and shopping village in San Pablo, California
Abella, Latin name of Avella, town in Italy
Abella, a synonym of the moth genus Porela